A correlation coefficient is a numerical measure of some type of correlation, meaning a statistical relationship between two variables. The variables may be two columns of a given data set of observations, often called a sample, or two components of a multivariate random variable with a known distribution.

Several types of correlation coefficient exist, each with their own definition and own range of usability and characteristics. They all assume values in the range from −1 to +1, where ±1 indicates the strongest possible agreement and 0 the strongest possible disagreement. As tools of analysis, correlation coefficients present certain problems, including the propensity of some types to be distorted by outliers and the possibility of incorrectly being used to infer a causal relationship between the variables (for more, see Correlation does not imply causation).

Types
There are several different measures for the degree of correlation in data, depending on the kind of data: principally whether the data is a measurement, ordinal, or categorical.

Pearson 
This is the best-known and most commonly used type of correlation coefficient. When the term "correlation coefficient" is used without further qualification, it usually refers to the Pearson product-moment correlation coefficient.

Intra-class 
Intraclass correlation (ICC) is a descriptive statistic that can be used, when quantitative measurements are made on units that are organized into groups; it describes how strongly units in the same group resemble each other.

Rank 
Rank correlation is a measure of the relationship between the rankings of two variables, or two rankings of the same variable:
Spearman's rank correlation coefficient is a measure of how well the relationship between two variables can be described by a monotonic function.
The Kendall tau rank correlation coefficient is a measure of the portion of ranks that match between two data sets.
Goodman and Kruskal's gamma is a measure of the strength of association of the cross tabulated data when both variables are measured at the ordinal level.

Tetrachoric and polychoric 

The polychoric correlation coefficient measures association between two ordered-categorical variables. It's technically defined as the estimate of the Pearson correlation coefficient one would obtain if:

 The two variables were measured on a continuous scale, instead of as ordered-category variables.
 The two continuous variables followed a bivariate normal distribution.

When both variables are dichotomous instead of ordered-categorical, the polychoric correlation coefficient is called the tetrachoric correlation coefficient.

See also
Correlation disattenuation
Coefficient of determination
Correlation and dependence
Correlation ratio
Distance correlation
Goodness of fit, any of several measures that measure how well a statistical model fits observations by summarizing the discrepancy between observed values and the values expected under the model
Multiple correlation
Partial correlation

Notes

References

Correlation indicators
Mathematical terminology